Amer Seifeddine Khan (born 4 June 1983) is a Lebanese former footballer player who played as a midfielder.

Honours
Safa
 Lebanese Premier League: 2011–12, 2012–13
 Lebanese FA Cup: 2012–13; runner-up: 2007–08, 2010–11
 Lebanese Elite Cup: 2009, 2012
 Lebanese Super Cup: 2013; runner-up: 2012
 AFC Cup runner-up: 2008

References

External links
 
 

Lebanese footballers
Living people
1983 births
Footballers from Beirut
Safa SC players
Lebanon international footballers
Association football midfielders
Lebanese Premier League players
Lebanese expatriate footballers
Expatriate footballers in Germany
Lebanese expatriate sportspeople in Germany